Heracleum mantegazzianum, commonly known as giant hogweed, is a monocarpic perennial herbaceous plant in the carrot family Apiaceae. H. mantegazzianum is also known as cartwheel-flower, giant cow parsley, giant cow parsnip, or hogsbane. In New Zealand, it is also sometimes called wild parsnip (not to be confused with Pastinaca sativa) or wild rhubarb.

Giant hogweed is native to the western Caucasus region of Eurasia. It was introduced to Britain as an ornamental plant in the 19th century, and has also spread to other areas in Western Europe, the United States, and Canada. Its close relatives, Sosnowsky's hogweed and Persian hogweed, have similarly spread to other parts of Europe.

The sap of giant hogweed is phototoxic and causes phytophotodermatitis in humans, resulting in blisters and scars.  These serious reactions are due to the furanocoumarin derivatives in the leaves, roots, stems, flowers, and seeds of the plant. Consequently, it is considered to be a noxious weed in many jurisdictions.

Etymology
The species name mantegazzianum refers to Paolo Mantegazza (1831–1910), Italian traveller and anthropologist.

Description

The leaves are incised and deeply lobed. Dark red spots on the stem each surround a single hair. The flowers are white or greenish white and may be radially symmetrical or strongly bilaterally symmetrical (zygomorphic). The fruits are schizocarps, producing seeds in dry, flattened, oval pairs.

Life cycle
The life cycle of giant hogweed consists of four phases:

Pre-flowering plants: In the first year, leaves sprout from seed. In subsequent years, leaves sprout from overwintering roots as well as seeds. This pre-flowering phase continues for several years.
Flowering plants (midsummer): After several years of growth, the plant flowers.
Seeds (late summer/early autumn): A flowering plant produces 20,000 or more seeds.
Dead stems (late autumn/winter): After producing seeds, the plant dies, leaving dried stems and seed heads standing.

During the first few years of growth, the leaves and stem of a pre-flowering plant die over the winter. In the spring, the plant grows back from its root. In other words, the giant hogweed is a herbaceous perennial.

A giant hogweed plant usually produces a flowering stalk in 3–5 years, but plants may take up to eight years to flower if conditions are unfavorable. In the Czech Republic, a single plant reached twelve years old before flowering. In any case, when the plant finally flowers, it does so between June and July (in the northern hemisphere).

Seeds are typically produced in August. A single flowering plant will produce 20,000 seeds on average with seed production varying between 10,000 and 50,000 seeds per plant.

Giant hogweed is a monocarpic perennial, that is, after a mature plant flowers and produces seed, the entire plant dies. During the following winter, tall dead stems mark the locations where the flowering plants once stood.

The seeds are dispersed short distances by wind, but can travel longer distances by water, animals, and people. Most seeds (95%) are found in the top  of the soil within a few meters of the parent plant. Seeds may stay alive in the seed bank for more than five years.

A seed deposited in the seed bank is initially dormant. Dormancy is broken by the cold and wet conditions of fall and winter, and so freshly deposited seeds lie dormant until at least the following spring, at which time approximately 90% of the previously dormant seeds will germinate. The rest remain dormant in the seed bank.

Seeds normally result from cross-pollination between two or more plants but self-pollination is also possible. More than half the seeds produced by self-pollination will germinate and give rise to healthy seedlings. Hence a single isolated seed may give rise to a colony of new plants.

Similar species
The various species of the genus Heracleum are similar in appearance, but vary in size. There are considerable differences in the size of the umbel, leaves, and stem of H. mantegazzianum as well.

The following table compares Heracleum mantegazzianum and Heracleum maximum feature by feature:

Other plant species in the family Apiaceae have features somewhat similar to those of the giant hogweed (H. mantegazzianum). Examples:

 In Ontario: cow parsnip (Heracleum maximum), wild parsnip (Pastinaca sativa), various angelica species (especially Angelica atropurpurea, the native purplestem angelica), and Queen Anne's lace (Daucus carota)
 In New York State: cow parsnip (Heracleum maximum), wild parsnip (Pastinaca sativa), angelica, and poison hemlock.
 In Europe: hogweed (Heracleum sphondylium and Heracleum sphondylium ssp sibiricum), wild parsnip (Pastinaca sativa), garden angelica (Angelica archangelica), and wild angelica (Angelica sylvestris)

Many more species exist; in Europe, over 20 species are found of the genus Heracleum alone.

None of these reach a similar size, but many are phototoxic.

Some other species, such as the abovementioned Heracleum sosnowskyi and Heracleum persicum, do reach similar sizes, and are equally noxious as a result.

Historical background
Heracleum mantegazzianum is native to the western Caucasus region of Eurasia. Because of its impressive size, giant hogweed was brought to Europe and North America as an ornamental plant and garden curiosity.

The following historical information grew out of the European Giant Alien Project, which began in 2005.

Migration across Europe

Heracleum mantegazzianum was first described in scientific literature in 1895 but by that time more than a dozen European countries had already imported the plant as an "ornamental curiosity". The introduction of Heracleum mantegazzianum was first recorded in Great Britain in 1817 when it was put on the seed list at the Kew Botanic Gardens in London. By 1828, the first natural population was recorded, growing wild in Cambridgeshire, England.

The spread of Heracleum mantegazzianum throughout Europe continued unabated until the middle of the 20th century, at which time the dangers of giant hogweed had become more widely known. Despite the warnings, however, the plant continued to be used by gardeners, beekeepers, and farmers (for cattle fodder) for another 50 years. Heracleum mantegazzianum was finally de-listed by the Royal Horticultural Society of Great Britain in 2002.

Migration to North America
During the 20th century, giant hogweed was transported to the United States and Canada for display in arboreta and Victorian gardens. The earliest recorded planting in North America was in 1917, in gardens near Highland Park in the city of Rochester, New York.

By 1950, giant hogweed had appeared in southern Ontario, and within a quarter century, the plant was firmly established in Ontario. It was first collected from Nova Scotia in 1980 and Quebec in 1990. Giant hogweed was still available for sale in Canadian nurseries as late as 2005.

On the west coast of North America, Heracleum mantegazzianum appeared in Oregon, Washington, and southwestern Canada but it is not clear how the species found its way into this region. First reports of giant hogweed in British Columbia were published in the 1930s.

Russia
Giant hogweed is native to Russia and was further distributed during the late 1960s, later spreading extensively on its own throughout Russia and eastern Europe.

Distribution

Giant hogweed is widespread throughout western and northern Europe, especially along terrains such as coastal areas and riverbanks. By forming dense stands, it can displace native plants and reduce wildlife habitats. It has spread in the northeastern and northwestern United States, and southern Canada and is an invasive species across western Europe; in sites where it has settled, it overtakes the local native species, Heracleum sphondylium.

In Canada, the plant occurs in most provinces, except in the prairies. It has been seen in Quebec since the early 1990s.  The plant's spread in Ontario began in the southwest and was seen in 2010 in the Greater Toronto Area and Renfrew County near Ottawa.

In the United States, giant hogweed occurs in Maine, Wisconsin and south to Indiana, Michigan, Maryland, and New Jersey. In June 2018, it was reported growing in Virginia and North Carolina. The plant is federally listed as a noxious weed in the US.

Giant hogweed is widespread in Russia and the Baltic states, and present in eastern Europe.

Public health and safety

The sap of the giant hogweed plant is phototoxic. Contact with the plant sap prevents the skin from being able to protect itself from sunlight, which leads to phytophotodermatitis, a serious skin inflammation. A phototoxic reaction can begin as soon as 15 minutes after contact with the sap. Photosensitivity peaks between 30 minutes and two hours after contact but can last for several days. Authorities advise that all humans (especially children) should stay away from giant hogweed. Protective clothing, including eye protection, should be worn when handling the plant. Parts of the body that come into contact with the sap of giant hogweed should be immediately washed with soap and cold water, and further exposure to sunlight should be avoided for at least 48 hours. Other Heracleum species, such as the cow parsnip (Heracleum maximum), are likewise phototoxic, and hence similar caution is advised. Owing to physical similarities to Queen Anne's lace, giant hogweed and its relatives are sometimes mistaken as harmless plants.

Control measures
Because of its phototoxicity and invasive nature, giant hogweed is often actively removed. The European Union funded the Giant Alien project to combat the plant.
On August 2, 2017, it added the species to its List of Invasive Alien Species of Union concern,
thus placing restrictions on keeping, importing, selling, breeding and growing it and requiring governments to detect and eradicate it throughout the EU. In the United Kingdom, the Wildlife and Countryside Act 1981 makes it an offence to plant or cause giant hogweed to grow in the wild.

In the United States, hogweed is regulated as a federal noxious weed by the U.S. Government, and is illegal to import into the United States or move interstate without a permit from the Department of Agriculture.  The USDA Forest Service states pigs and cattle can eat it without apparent harm. The New York State Department of Environmental Conservation has had an active program to control giant hogweed since 2008. In 2011, Maine state horticulturists, describing the plant as "Queen Anne's lace on steroids", reported that it has been found at 21 different locations in Maine, with the number of plants ranging from one to a hundred.

In popular culture
The 1971 album Nursery Cryme by the progressive rock group Genesis contains a song called 'The Return of the Giant Hogweed'. The darkly-humorous lyrics describe an attack on the human race by Heracleum mantegazzianum, long after the plant was first 'captured' and brought to England by a Victorian explorer.

In Season 10 Episode 3 "Ghosts" (first aired October 20, 2019) of the AMC television series The Walking Dead, the character Aaron is attacked by "walkers" that have hogweed flowers growing from their decomposing bodies. Aaron comes into close contact with the hogweed, rendering him unable to properly see, and more susceptible to harm.

In her 1985 novel "Curse of the Giant Hogweed", popular mystery author Charlotte MacLeod places her established character Peter Shandy and his colleagues in a fantasy version of Wales to investigate Giant Hogweed endangering Britain's hedgerows.

See also
 Heracleum, the genus
 Other tall invasive Heracleum species: Heracleum sosnowskyi and Heracleum persicum
 Non-invasive Heracleum species: Heracleum sphondylium and Heracleum maximum
 Species that can be mistaken for Heracleum mantegazzianum: wild parsnip, garden angelica, wild angelica
 List of poisonous plants

References

External links

Giant Hogweed (Heracleum mantegazzianum): A Federal Noxious Weed U.S. Department of Agriculture

Photo of blisters caused by the plant (Graphic) from the Finnish Environment Institute  (archived February 6, 2012)
Surveys for natural enemies of giant hogweed (Heracleum mantegazzianum) in the Caucasus region and assessment for their classical biological control potential in Europe
"Beware Giant Hogweed!" brochure from New York State Department of Environmental Conservation
"Giant Hogweed in Germany"
 
Species Profile – Giant Hogweed (Heracleum mantegazzianum), National Invasive Species Information Center, United States National Agricultural Library.
 Antonova, Maria, "A Toxic Alien Is Taking Over Russia", The New York Times, October 3, 2020
The Day of the Giant Hogweed! John Harrison

Apioideae
Flora of Asia